Geoffrey II (23 September 1158 – 19 August 1186) was Duke of Brittany and 3rd Earl of Richmond between 1181 and 1186, through his marriage to Constance, Duchess of Brittany. Geoffrey was the fourth of five sons of Henry II of England and Eleanor, Duchess of Aquitaine.

Life

In the 1160s, Henry II began to alter his policy of indirect rule in Brittany and to exert more direct control. Henry had been at war with Conan IV, Duke of Brittany. Local Breton nobles rebelled against Conan, so Conan sought Henry II's help. In 1164, Henry intervened to seize lands along the border of Brittany and Normandy and, in 1166, he invaded Brittany to punish the local barons. Henry then forced Conan to abdicate as duke and to give Brittany to his five-year-old daughter, Constance, who was handed over and betrothed to Henry's son Geoffrey. This arrangement was quite unusual in terms of medieval law, as Conan might have had sons who could have legitimately inherited the duchy. Geoffrey and Constance eventually married, in July 1181.

Growing tensions between Henry and Louis VII of France finally spilled over into open war in 1167, triggered by a trivial argument over how money destined for the Crusader states of the Levant should be collected. Louis allied himself with the Welsh, Scots and Bretons and attacked Normandy. Henry responded by attacking Chaumont-sur-Epte, where Louis kept his main military arsenal, burning the town to the ground and forcing Louis to abandon his allies and make a private truce. Henry was then free to move against the rebel barons in Brittany, where feelings about his seizure of the duchy were still running high.

Geoffrey was fifteen years old when he joined the first revolt against his father. He later reconciled to Henry in 1174 when he participated in the truce at Gisors. Geoffrey prominently figured in the second revolt of 1183, fighting against Richard, on behalf of Henry the Young King.

Geoffrey was a good friend of Louis VII's son Philip, and the two men were frequently in alliance against King Henry. Geoffrey spent much time at Philip's court in Paris, and Philip made him his seneschal. There is evidence to suggest that Geoffrey was planning another rebellion with Philip's help during his final period in Paris in the summer of 1186. As a participant in so many rebellions against his father, Geoffrey acquired a reputation for treachery. Gerald of Wales wrote the following of him: "He has more aloes than honey in him; his tongue is smoother than oil; his sweet and persuasive eloquence has enabled him to dissolve the firmest alliances and by his powers of language able to corrupt two kingdoms; of tireless endeavour, a hypocrite in everything, a deceiver and a dissembler."

Geoffrey also was known to attack monasteries and churches in order to raise funds for his campaigns. This lack of reverence for religion earned him the displeasure of the Church and, as a consequence, of the majority of chroniclers who wrote about his life.

Family
Geoffrey and Constance had three children, one born after Geoffrey's death:
 Eleanor, Fair Maid of Brittany (1184–1241)
 Maud/Matilda of Brittany (1185–before May 1189)
 Arthur I, Duke of Brittany (1187–1203?)

Death
Geoffrey died on 19 August 1186, at the age of 27, in Paris. There is also evidence that supports a death date of 21 August 1186. There are two alternative accounts of his death. The more common first version holds that he was trampled to death in a jousting tournament. At his funeral, a grief-stricken Philip is said to have tried to jump into the coffin. Roger of Hoveden's chronicle is the source of this version; the detail of Philip's hysterical grief is from Gerald of Wales.

In the second version, in the chronicle of the French royal clerk Rigord, Geoffrey died of sudden acute chest pain, which reportedly struck immediately after his speech to Philip, boasting his intention to lay Normandy to waste. Possibly, this version was an invention of its chronicler, sudden illness being God's judgment of an ungrateful son plotting rebellion against his father, and for his irreligiosity. Alternatively, the tournament story may be an invention of Philip's to prevent Henry II's discovery of a plot; by inventing a social reason, a tournament, for Geoffrey's being in Paris, Philip obscured their meeting's true purpose.

Marie of Champagne, with whom Geoffrey was on good terms, was present at the requiem for her half-brother and established a mass chantry for the repose of his soul.

Geoffrey was buried in the choir of Notre-Dame de Paris Cathedral, but his tombstone was destroyed in the 18th century before the French Revolution. His body was exhumed in 1797 and measured at 5 ft 6.5 in (1.69 m).

Succession
After Geoffrey's death, Henry II arranged for Constance, Geoffrey's widow, to marry Ranulf de Blondeville, 6th Earl of Chester. Ranulf would become Duke of Brittany, jure uxoris, for a short time before this marriage was annulled.

Portrayals

In literature 
Geoffrey II of Brittany is a major character in the play The Lion in Winter (1966) by James Goldman where his portrayal is reminiscent of that made by Gerald of Wales, and in the novel Devil's Brood (2008) by Sharon Kay Penman. He is also mentioned in the tragedies The Troublesome Reign of King John (anonymous, c.1589), King John (1593–1596) by William Shakespeare and King John by Richard Valpy, the poem Le petit Arthur de Bretagne à la tour de Rouen (1822) by Marceline Desbordes-Valmore, the drama Arthur de Bretagne (1885) by Louis Tiercelin and the novels Lionheart (2011) and A King's Ransom (2014) by Sharon Kay Penman, as well as in the second volume of the trilogy Le Château des Poulfenc (2009) by Brigitte Coppin.

In theatre and television 
Geoffrey has been portrayed by John Castle in the movie The Lion in Winter (1968) and by John Light in the 2003 made-for-TV remake. He has also been portrayed by Austin Somervell (as a boy) and Martin Neil (as an adult) in the BBC TV drama series The Devil's Crown (1978).

Genealogical table

See also
 Dukes of Brittany family tree
Earl of Richmond
 British monarchs family tree
 Other politically important horse accidents

Notes

References

Bibliography

 Costain, Thomas B. The Conquering Family, 1962
 
 Everard, Judith. Brittany and the Angevins: Province and Empire, 1158–1203, 2000
 Gillingham, John. The Life and Times of Richard I, 1973
 Gillingham, John. Richard the Lionheart, 1978
 Gillihgham, John. Richard I, 1999
 Reston, James. Warriors of God: Richard the Lion-Heart and Saladin in the Third Crusade, 2001

External links
 The Medieval Sourcebook contains many primary sources including Hoveden and Gerald of Wales, some of which pertains to Geoffrey

 

1158 births
1186 deaths
12th-century dukes of Brittany
12th-century English nobility
House of Plantagenet
Deaths by horse-riding accident in France
Jure uxoris officeholders
House of Anjou
Earls of Richmond (1136 creation)
Burials at Notre-Dame de Paris
Children of Henry II of England
Anglo-Normans
Sons of kings